The Complete Sham 69 Live is a live album by punk band Sham 69, released in 1989 (see 1989 in music).

Track listing
 "Hurry Up Harry" - 2:36
 "I Don't Wanna" - 1:53
 "If the Kids Are United" - 3:26
 "Borstal Breakout" - 3:03
 "Angels with Dirty Faces" - 2:59
 "They Don't Understand" - 2:15
 "Rip and Tear" - 3:30
 "Day Tripper" - 3:22
 "That's Life" - 2:25
 "Poor Cow" - 3:07
 "Give a Dog a Bone" - 2:37
 "Questions and Answers - 3:12
 "Tell Us the Truth" - 2:19
 "Hersham Boys" - 3:11
 "Vision and the Power" - 3:42
 "White Riot" - 1:24

References 

Sham 69 live albums
1989 live albums